History of Ha is a 2021 Filipino drama film written, directed, and edited by Lav Diaz. It premiered at the BFI London Film Festival on October 12, 2021 as part of the Dare section. It earned seven nominations at the 2022 Gawad Urian Awards including Best Film, Best Actor, and Best Direction. The Young Critics' Circle awarded it Best Picture for 2021 and Best Actor for John Lloyd Cruz.

Premise 
Hernando Alamada (John Lloyd Cruz), a vaudeville great and a former socialist cadre, knows that the Philippines is experiencing a bitter transition yet again after the president, Ramon Magsaysay, unexpectedly dies in a plane crash. Alamada treads on an aimless journey and descends into absurd madness before finding redemption.

Cast 

 John Lloyd Cruz
 Teroy Guzman
 Mae Paner
 Dolly de Leon
 Jonathan Francisco
 Hazel Orencio
 Earl Ignacio
 Gabuco Eliezl
 Jun Sabayton

References

External links 

 

2021 films
2021 drama films
Philippine drama films
Philippine black-and-white films
Films directed by Lav Diaz